Non Serviam is the second full-length album by Greek extreme metal band Rotting Christ, released in 1994.

In Latin, Non serviam translates to "I will not serve", and Biblically refers to Satan's refusal to serve God. It also has some different connotations in secular literary works.

Frontman Sakis Tolis has the words tattooed on his stomach.

After 12 years of discontinued print, the album was re-released by The End Records in 2006.

Contrary to popular belief that drum programming was used on this album, the drums were actually recorded live using an electronic drum kit.

Track listing
All songs written by Mutilator & Necromayhem, except where noted. (Copyright Unisound Music.)
 "The Fifth Illusion" – 5:33
 "Wolfera the Chacal" – 7:13
 "Non Serviam" – 5:01
 "Morallity of a Dark Age" – 5:02
 "Where Mortals Have No Pride" – 7:48
 "Fethroesforia" – 1:36 [instrumental]
 "Mephesis of Black Crystal" – 5:24
 "Ice Shaped God" – 3:54
 "Saturn Unlock Avey's Son" – 6:22

Personnel
Sakis Tolis – guitars, vocals
Magus Wampyr Daoloth – keyboards, synthesizers, backing vocals
Mutilator – bass
Necrosauron – drums

Production
Arranged & produced by Rotting Christ
Recorded & engineered by George Zaharopoulos

References

External links
Non Serviam at Discogs
Non Serviam at Encyclopaedia Metallum

Rotting Christ albums
1994 albums